Madame is the debut studio album by Italian rapper and singer Madame. The album was released on 19 March 2021 and includes the singles "Baby", "Clito", "Il mio amico" and the 2021 Sanremo Music Festival entry "Voce".

On 22 March 2021, the album ranked fourth in Spotify's Top 10 Global Album Debuts.

In July 2021, the album won the Targa Tenco for Best Debut Album.

Musically, Madame is a hip hop and R&B album, with pop, pop rap and trap elements.

Track listing

Charts

Weekly charts

Year-end charts

Certifications

References

2021 debut albums